1860 is a 1934 Italian historical film directed by Alessandro Blasetti and starring Giuseppe Gulino, Aida Bellia and Gianfranco Giachetti.

The film presages Italian neorealism in that it was shot mainly on location. Some scenes were also shot at the Cines Studios in Rome. Also, most contemporaneous historical epics used a star to focus on grand historical characters. This film focuses on a character whom nobody knows or will ever know; a patriot riding to get the assistance of Giuseppe Garibaldi. This film (in its heralding of neorealism) illustrates how the average man plays a part in grand histories. The film also uses non-actors (a key element of Italian neorealism) and a rarity for its time and era.

Cast
The film includes many non-professional actors, Gianfranco Giachetti (brother of Fosco Giachetti), Maria Denis, and Mario Ferrari. It was the last film of Ugo Gracci. A list of the non-actors includes Giuseppe Gulino, Aida Bellia and many others.

Plot
The story is the harried attempt of a Sicilian partisan (as part of the Risorgimento) to reach Garibaldi's headquarters in Northern Italy, and to petition the revered revolutionary to rescue part of his besieged land. Along the way, the peasant hero encounters many colorful Italians, differing in class and age, and holding political opinions of every type.

The film ends on the battlefield, making Italian unification a success, despite brutal losses.

Scholarly and other interpretation
Gabriella Romani, in an Italica article from 2002 (part of the JSTOR arts and sciences complex), writes:

Certainly the film drew upon the Soviet films of Sergei Eisenstein and the Macchiaioli painters, but just as important may be, the "Risorgimento female iconography was produced by nineteenth-century patriotic painters and writers."

Notes

External links 

1934 films
Films directed by Alessandro Blasetti
Italian war drama films
Italian historical drama films
1930s Italian-language films
Italian black-and-white films
1930s historical drama films
1930s war drama films
Films set in 1860
Films set in Sicily
Films shot in Italy
Cines Studios films
Cultural depictions of Giuseppe Garibaldi